Hadrian's Tower is a residential tower block in Newcastle upon Tyne. Located at 27 Rutherford Street, construction started in 2018 and was completed in September 2020.

History
Hadrian's Tower was designed by Faulkner Browns, built by Tolent Construction, glazed by EVB Facades (UK) Ltd and handed over to the developer, The High Street Group, in September 2020 and opened in December 2020.

See also 
 List of tallest buildings and structures in Newcastle upon Tyne

References

External links 

Residential buildings completed in 2020
Buildings and structures in Newcastle upon Tyne